Future Clouds and Radar is an American rock group from Austin, Texas. It was founded by Robert Harrison after the dissolution of his previous group, Cotton Mather, and features several of the same musicians.

History 
Following the commercial failure of The Big Picture, Cotton Mather quietly ended in 2003. Harrison stepped away from the music world for some time to focus on raising his family. When he returned to making music in 2006, he assembled a collective of musicians and set about "creating music that couldn't be boxed in". Although the music was recorded by a vast array of musicians with Harrison as the only constant member, he still chose to present it as a band to emphasize the contributions of the other musicians.

The first release from the group, and the first release on Harrison's Star Apple Kingdom label, was an eponymous double album, released in 2007. Future Clouds And Radar was much more experimental and varied than the work of Cotton Mather, incorporating genres as wide-ranging as reggae, psychedelia, avant-garde, and ambient music in addition to pop and rock. The following year, the group released a second album, Peoria, which continued in the same musical vein. Also in 2008, a single-disc distillation of the debut album was released in the UK, removing eleven tracks and adding three otherwise unavailable acoustic performances.

The group never officially disbanded, and occasionally still plays around Austin, but have not released anything since 2009. Although Harrison's now-defunct blog stated that the "Songs from the I Ching" project would feature music from both of his projects, everything that has been released as of 2019 has been credited to Cotton Mather.

Videos
Nickelodeon animator Keith Graves was chosen to create a video of the song "Dr. No." Other videos include:
 Holy Janet Comes on Waves
 Back Seat Silver Jet Sighter
 This Is Really A Book
 Build Havana
 Hurricane Judy
 The Epcot View

Reception
Austinist described the group as "Beatles-esque psychedelia", while The New Yorker described the music as "sprawling orchestral art rock." NPR wrote ""Audacious? Sure. But undeniably impressive." Texas public radio station KUT listed it among the best albums of the year 2007, while Pop Narcotic listed it in its top 10 of the year.

 "It's up for debate whether Austin-based Robert Harrison's double-disc debut is pure genius with blind ambition, or the product of an excess of ideas. In any case, his band Future Clouds and Radar certainly knows how to entertain. The self-titled album crosses a dozen different styles and gets handed numerous genre-definers, all of which include the word "art" as a prefix. Future Clouds and Radar would seem to be inspired by The Flaming Lips or Guided By Voices, whose prolificacy Harrison emulates." (NPR).
 "A triumph of schizophrenic musical vision ... a beautiful and brilliant mess ... magnificent double disc collection of pop gems – 4 stars." (Paste Magazine).
 "Whether FC&R is essaying dreamy, electronicaized psychedelia, blue-eyed soul anthemry, Latin-flecked jangle-pop, or full-guns a-blazing, fuzzed-out garage, the material is executed with a jazzlike precision and suffused with a deeply emotional, spontaneous vibe. Winner 2007's Debut Artist of the Year" (Harp Magazine). Harp placed Future Clouds and Radar as number 4 on its list of top 50 CDs of 2007.

Discography

Future Clouds and Radar
 Released: 2007
 Label: Star Apple Kingdom

Disc 1
Birds Of Prey
Let Me Get Your Coat
Hurricane Judy
Drugstore Bust
This Is Really A Book
You Will Be Loved
Quicksilver
Where's My Drink?
Holy Janet Comes On Waves
Wake Up And Live
Our Time
Green Mountain Clover
Devil No More

Disc 2
Quicksilver 2
Get Your Boots On
Build Havana
Dr. No
Back Seat Silver Jet Sighter
Malice of Stars
The Great Escape
Letters To Junius
Altitude
Cowboy Weather
Armitage Shanks
Christmas Day 1923
Wake
Safety Zone

UK single-CD edition 

 Birds Of Prey
 Let Me Get Your Coat
 Hurricane Judy
 Drugstore Bust
 This Is Really A Book
 You Will Be Loved
 Quicksilver
 Get Your Boots On
 Build Havana
 Dr. No
 Back Seat Silver Jet Sighter
 Malice Of Stars
 Altitude
 Cowboy Weather
 Safety Zone
 Green Mountain Clover
 Holy Janet Comes On Waves (Acoustic)
 Quicksilver (Acoustic)
 Let Me Get Your Coat (Acoustic)

Peoria
 Released: 2008
 Label: Star Apple Kingdom

The Epcot View
Old Edmund Ruffin
Feet On Grass
Mummified
18 Months
The Mortal
Mortal 926
Follow The Crane

References

External links
Official Robert Harrison website
 Pop Matters: Peoria
 Pop Matters: Future Clouds and Radar - "The Epcot View" (MP3/video)

Rock music groups from Texas
American power pop groups
Musical groups established in 2006
Musical groups from Austin, Texas